Tomassi may refer to 

 Clementina Teti-Tomassi, Canadian politician
 Malgosia Tomassi, interior designer
 Rolo Tomassi, a British mathcore band from Sheffield, England
 Tony Tomassi, Quebec politician

See also
 Tomasi, a given name and surname
 Tommasi, a surname